The 2018–19 season was ŠK Slovan Bratislava's 13th consecutive in the top flight of Slovak football.

After five years, Slovan managed to win the league title. Having won the 2017–18 Slovak Cup, Slovan were the defending champions, but were eliminated after the first match due to breaching the rules of the competition. Slovan also competed in the UEFA Europa League, but they were eliminated in the third qualifying round.

The season was exceptional for the club in several ways. On 3 March 2019, Slovan opened its new stadium and returned home after more than nine years. On 3 May 2019, the club celebrated 100 years since its founding.

Slovan clinched the title on 14 April 2019, six rounds before the end of the competition. Andraž Šporar became the league's best goalscorer, scoring 29 goals and tying the record for most goals scored in a season in the Slovak Super Liga. 

The season covers the period from 1 June 2018 to 31 May 2019.

Players

As of 24 May 2019

Transfers and loans

Transfers in

Loans in

Transfers out

Loans out

Friendlies

Pre-season

On-season

Mid-season

Competition overview

Fortuna liga

League table

Regular stage

Championship group

Results summary

Results by matchday

Matches

Slovak Cup

UEFA Europa League

First qualifying round

Second qualifying round

Third qualifying round

Statistics

Appearances

Goalscorers

Clean sheets

Disciplinary record

Attendances

Total

Before the winter break at the Pasienky Stadium

After the winter break at the Tehelné Pole Stadium

Awards

Fortuna liga Player of the Month

Fortuna liga Goal of the Month

Fortuna liga Team of the Season

Fortuna liga Player of the Season

Fortuna liga Manager of the Season

Fortuna liga Top Scorer of the Season

Fortuna liga Under-21 Team of the Season

References

ŠK Slovan Bratislava seasons
ŠK Slovan Bratislava season
Slovan Bratislava